Bradley David Walter Scott (born 3 May 1976) is a former Australian rules footballer who is currently the coach of the Essendon Football Club in the Australian Football League (AFL). He played for Hawthorn and the Brisbane Lions, and was previously the coach of the North Melbourne Football Club from 2010 until 2019.

Playing career

Hawthorn
Scott was recruited to Hawthorn in the 1994 national draft at pick 60, without playing a game, he was delisted and then re-drafted by Hawthorn in the 1996 draft, where he won the reserves best-and-fairest. Making his senior debut in 1997, Brad played all 22 games and was seen as a very solid contributor, but was traded at the end of that season to the Brisbane Lions, enabling him to play in the same side as his brother Chris. 

Brad Scott played a total of 22 games and kicked 6 goals in the 1997 season, for Hawthorn Football Club.

Brisbane Lions
Scott was a very solid contributor over a number of years with the Lions and was seen as a fearless figure in defence. While defiant, Scott battled numerous injuries including one incurred during his milestone 150th game late in 2005.

Like his brother, Scott was renowned for being one of the hardest players in the league. They were both integral members of the Brisbane Lions' first two premierships in 2001 and 2002.

Injuries saw him miss the 2003 premiership and sidelined for the latter part of 2004.

Scott's lacklustre form in 2004 and 2005 fed speculation that his contract with the Lions would not be renewed, however he remained with the club and announced on 10 August 2006 that he would retire from his playing career at the end of the 2006 season. Scott played his farewell game in Round 22 against the Saints.

Brad Scott played a total of 146 games and kicked a total of 39 goals for Brisbane Lions from 1998 until 2006.

Coaching career

Collingwood Football Club assistant coach
Retirement from playing, saw Scott become an assistant coach as the development coach at Collingwood, where he had success working closely with a number of young Magpies and other players.

North Melbourne Football Club senior coach (2010-2019)
Scott was also a candidate for the vacant coaching position at Richmond, however he believed his skill set suited North far better and was appointed as senior coach of North Melbourne for the 2010 season, signing a three-year contract on 17 August 2009. Scott replaced caretaker senior coach Darren Crocker, who replaced Dean Laidley after Laidley resigned in the middle of the 2009 season. 

Scott had a terrible start to his coaching career, with three of the first four matches resulting in losses, including a 104-point thrashing from 2009 runners-up St Kilda. Since then, North made steady progress and finished outside the top eight on percentage.

Although North Melbourne missed the finals for the second year in succession, Scott was rewarded with a contract extension as Kangaroos coach, with president James Brayshaw stating that he was satisfied with the club's progress under Scott. He led the team to 8th position and a spot in the finals at the end of the 2012 home and away season, with the side winning ten of its last twelve matches (including six in a row between Rounds 16–21) since a 115-point loss to Hawthorn in Round 10. The club was then defeated in their elimination final match against West Coast by 96 points.

Following North Melbourne's disappointing season in 2013 after losing 10 matches by 16 points or less, the 2014 season began with a positive outlook as Nick Dal Santo was added to North Melbourne's list as a restricted free agent at the end of the 2013 season. With North Melbourne's now silky midfield looking strong, the success of the 2014 season saw Scott lead North Melbourne into his second finals series as coach after finishing 6th at the end of the premiership season. Winning their elimination final match against Essendon by 12 points, then defeating Geelong in the semi final to progress to Scotts' first preliminary final as coach against Sydney, but the 71-point loss ended North Melbourne's finals run.

The beginning of the 2015 season once again saw Scott make some vital inclusions to North Melbourne's list, with the addition of tall-forward Jarrad Waite and medium forward/midfielder Shaun Higgins. Despite finishing 8th, Scott was under scrutiny after a highly controversial decision to rest 9 players in Round 23 against Richmond, which was deemed by many to be a form of 'tanking'. Scott's 'plan' however, proved to be successful after defeating Richmond in the elimination final the following week by 17 points and going on to defeat Sydney in the semi final to become the first ever team to reach a preliminary final after finishing 8th in the premiership season. North Melbourne's run was ended by West Coast at Domain Stadium by 25 points.

Scott resigned as senior coach of North Melbourne on 26 May 2019 in the middle of the 2019 season, after ten rounds. Scott was then replaced by assistant coach Rhyce Shaw as caretaker senior coach of North Melbourne for the rest of the 2019 season, who was eventually appointed as full-time senior coach.

Essendon Football Club senior coach (2023-present)
Scott was appointed as the senior coach of Essendon for 2023 in September 2022. Scott replaced Ben Rutten, who was sacked as senior coach of Essendon at the end of the 2022 season. 

Scott currently ranks 3rd for most AFL/VFL games coached without making a grand final and until joining Essendon was the only one of those three coaches to do it solely at the one club.

Statistics

Playing statistics

|- style="background-color: #EAEAEA"
! scope="row" style="text-align:center" | 1997
|style="text-align:center;"|
| 28 || 22 || 6 || 7 || 233 || 101 || 334 || 75 || 36 || 0.3 || 0.3 || 10.6 || 4.6 || 15.2 || 3.4 || 1.6
|-
! scope="row" style="text-align:center" | 1998
|style="text-align:center;"|
| 5 || 19 || 5 || 6 || 201 || 106 || 307 || 52 || 32 || 0.3 || 0.3 || 10.6 || 5.6 || 16.2 || 2.7 || 1.7
|- style="background-color: #EAEAEA"
! scope="row" style="text-align:center" | 1999
|style="text-align:center;"|
| 5 || 8 || 0 || 2 || 49 || 16 || 65 || 14 || 9 || 0.0 || 0.3 || 6.1 || 2.0 || 8.1 || 1.8 || 1.1
|-
! scope="row" style="text-align:center" | 2000
|style="text-align:center;"|
| 5 || 0 || — || — || — || — || — || — || — || — || — || — || — || — || — || —
|- style="background-color: #EAEAEA"
! scope="row" style="text-align:center" | 2001
|style="text-align:center;"|
| 5 || 22 || 14 || 4 || 197 || 108 || 305 || 84 || 44 || 0.6 || 0.2 || 9.0 || 4.9 || 13.9 || 3.8 || 2.0
|-
! scope="row" style="text-align:center" | 2002
|style="text-align:center;"|
| 5 || 25 || 8 || 10 || 315 || 179 || 494 || 136 || 55 || 0.3 || 0.4 || 12.6 || 7.2 || 19.8 || 5.4 || 2.2
|- style="background-color: #EAEAEA"
! scope="row" style="text-align:center" | 2003
|style="text-align:center;"|
| 5 || 22 || 5 || 8 || 245 || 166 || 411 || 112 || 48 || 0.2 || 0.4 || 11.1 || 7.5 || 18.7 || 5.1 || 2.2
|-
! scope="row" style="text-align:center" | 2004
|style="text-align:center;"|
| 5 || 15 || 4 || 1 || 138 || 89 || 227 || 60 || 30 || 0.3 || 0.1 || 9.2 || 5.9 || 15.1 || 4.0 || 2.0
|- style="background-color: #EAEAEA"
! scope="row" style="text-align:center" | 2005
|style="text-align:center;"|
| 5 || 17 || 2 || 1 || 115 || 92 || 207 || 55 || 14 || 0.1 || 0.1 || 6.8 || 5.4 || 12.2 || 3.2 || 0.8
|-
! scope="row" style="text-align:center" | 2006
|style="text-align:center;"|
| 5 || 18 || 1 || 1 || 151 || 115 || 266 || 88 || 43 || 0.1 || 0.1 || 8.4 || 6.4 || 14.8 || 4.9 || 2.4
|- class="sortbottom"
! colspan=3| Career
! 168
! 45
! 40
! 1644
! 972
! 2616
! 676
! 311
! 0.3
! 0.2
! 9.8
! 5.8
! 15.6
! 4.0
! 1.9
|}

Coaching statistics

|- style="background-color: #EAEAEA"
! scope="row" style="font-weight:normal"|2010
|
| 22 || 11 || 11 || 0 || 50.0% || 9 || 16
|-
! scope="row" style="font-weight:normal"|2011
|
| 22 || 10 || 12 || 0 || 45.5% || 9 || 17
|- style="background-color: #EAEAEA"
! scope="row" style="font-weight:normal"|2012
|
| 23 || 14 || 9 || 0 || 60.9% || 8 || 18
|-
! scope="row" style="font-weight:normal"|2013
|
| 22 || 10 || 12 || 0 || 45.5% || 10 || 18
|- style="background-color: #EAEAEA"
! scope="row" style="font-weight:normal"|2014
|
| 25 || 16 || 9 || 0 || 64.0% || 6 || 18
|- 
! scope="row" style="font-weight:normal"|2015
|
| 21 || 13 || 8 || 0 || 60% || 4 || 18
|- style="background-color: #EAEAEA"
! scope="row" style="font-weight:normal"|2016
|
| 22 || 12 || 10 || 0 || 52.2% || 8 || 18
|- style="background-color: #EAEAEA"
! scope="row" style="font-weight:normal"|2017
|
| 22 || 6 || 16 || 0 || 27.3% || 15 || 18
|- style="background-color: #EAEAEA"
! scope="row" style="font-weight:normal"|2018
|
| 22 || 12 || 10 || 0 || 54.5% || 9 || 18
|- style="background-color: #EAEAEA"
! scope="row" style="font-weight:normal"|2019
|
| 10 || 3 || 7 || 0 || 30% || 17 || 18
|- class="sortbottom"
! colspan=2| Career totals
! 211
! 106
! 105
! 0
! 50.23%
! colspan=2|
|}

Personal life
Scott's identical twin brother Chris Scott played alongside him at the Brisbane Lions and is now the coach of Geelong. Brad is the younger twin by a few minutes.

In September 2014, Scott's wife Penny gave birth to their first child, a son.

References

External links

1976 births
Living people
Australian rules footballers from Melbourne
Brisbane Lions players
Brisbane Lions Premiership players
Hawthorn Football Club players
North Melbourne Football Club coaches
People educated at St Kevin's College, Melbourne
Eastern Ranges players
Australian twins
Twin sportspeople
Identical twins
Australia international rules football team players
Two-time VFL/AFL Premiership players